Villa Unión is a city and seat of the municipality of Poanas, in the state of Durango, north-western Mexico. As of 2010, the city had a population of 10,753.

References

Populated places in Durango